Milkha Singh (20 November 1929  18 June 2021), also known as The Flying Sikh, was an Indian track and field sprinter who was introduced to the sport while serving in the Indian Army. He is the only athlete to win gold at 400 metres at the Asian Games as well as the Commonwealth Games. He also won gold medals in the 1958 and 1962 Asian Games. He represented India in the 1956 Summer Olympics in Melbourne, the 1960 Summer Olympics in Rome and the 1964 Summer Olympics in Tokyo. He was awarded the Padma Shri, India's fourth-highest civilian honour, in recognition of his sporting achievements.

The race for which Singh was best remembered is his fourth-place finish in the 400 metres final at the 1960 Olympic Games, which he had entered as one of the favourites. He led the race till the 200m mark before easing off, allowing others to pass him. Various records were broken in the race, which required a photo-finish and saw American Otis Davis being declared the winner by one-hundredth of a second over German Carl Kaufmann. Singh's fourth-place time of 45.73 seconds was the Indian national record for almost 40 years.

From beginnings that saw him orphaned and displaced during the Partition of India, Singh has become a sporting icon in his country. In 2008, journalist Rohit Brijnath described Singh as "the finest athlete India has ever produced".

Singh died of COVID-19 complications on 18 June 2021 at the age of 91, five days after his wife, Nirmal Saini.

Early life 
Milkha Singh was born on 20 November 1929 into a  Rathore Rajput Sikh family. His birthplace was Govindpura, a village  from Muzaffargarh city in Punjab Province, British India (now Muzaffargarh District, Pakistan). He was one of 15 siblings, eight of whom died before the Partition of India. He was orphaned during the Partition when his parents, a brother and two sisters were killed in the violence that ensued between the villagers and Muslims who tried to convert them. He witnessed these killings.

Escaping the troubles in Punjab, where killings of Hindus and Sikhs were continuing, by moving to Delhi, India, in 1947, Singh lived for a short time with the family of his married sister and was briefly imprisoned at Tihar jail for travelling on a train without a ticket. His sister, Ishvar, sold some jewellery to obtain his release. He spent some time at a refugee camp in Purana Qila and at a resettlement colony in Shahdara, both in Delhi.

Singh became disenchanted with his life and considered becoming a dacoit but was instead persuaded by one of his brothers, Malkhan, to attempt recruitment to the Indian Army. He successfully gained entrance on his fourth attempt, in 1951, and while stationed at the Electrical Mechanical Engineering Centre in Secunderabad and he was introduced to athletics. He had run the 10km distance to and from school as a child and was selected by the army for special training in athletics after finishing sixth in a compulsory cross-country run for new recruits. Singh has acknowledged how the army introduced him to sport, saying that "I came from a remote village, I didn't know what running was, or the Olympics".

International career
Singh represented India in the 200m and 400m competitions of the 1956 Melbourne Olympic Games. His inexperience meant that he did not progress from the heat stages but a meeting with the eventual 400m champion at those Games, Charles Jenkins, both inspired him to greater things and provided him with information about training methods.

In 1958, Singh set records for the 200m and 400m in the National Games of India, held at Cuttack, and also won gold medals in the same events at the Asian Games. He then won a gold medal in the 400m (440 yards at this time) competition at the 1958 British Empire and Commonwealth Games with a time of 46.6 seconds. This latter achievement made him the first gold medalist at the Commonwealth Games from independent India. Before Vikas Gowda won the gold in 2014, Milkha was the only Indian male to have won an individual athletics gold medal at those Games.

Singh was persuaded by Jawaharlal Nehru to set aside his memories of the Partition era to race successfully in 1960 against Abdul Khaliq in Pakistan, where a post-race comment by the then General Ayub Khan led to him acquiring the nickname of The Flying Sikh. Some sources say that he set a world record of 45.8 seconds in France, shortly before the Rome Olympics in the same year but the official report of the Games lists the record holder as Lou Jones, who ran 45.2 at Los Angeles in 1956. At those Olympics, he was involved in a close-run final race in the 400m competition, where he was placed fourth. Singh had beaten all the leading contenders other than Otis Davis, and a medal had been anticipated because of his good form. However, he made an error when leading the race at 250m, slowing down in the belief that his pace could not be sustained and looking round at his fellow competitors. Singh believes that these errors caused him to lose his medal opportunity and they are his "worst memory". Davis, Carl Kaufmann and Malcolm Spence all passed him, and a photo-finish resulted. Davis and Kaufman were both timed at a world-record breaking 44.9 seconds, while Spence and Singh went under the pre-Games Olympic record of 45.9 seconds, set in 1952 by George Rhoden and Herb McKenley, with times of 45.5 and 45.6 seconds, respectively. The Age noted in 2006 that "Milkha Singh is the only Indian to have broken an Olympic track record. Unfortunately he was the fourth man to do so in the same race" but the official Olympic report notes that Davis had already equalled the Rhoden/McKenley Olympic record in the quarter-finals and surpassed it with a time of 45.5 seconds in the semi-finals.

At the 1962 Asian Games, held in Jakarta, Singh won gold in the 400m and in the 4 x 400m relay. He attended the 1964 Olympic Games in Tokyo, where he was entered to compete in the 400m, the 4 x 100m relay and the 4 x 400m relay. He did not take part in either the 400m or the 4 x 100m relay and the Indian team of Milkha Singh, Makhan Singh, Amrit Pal and Ajmer Singh were eliminated when they finished fourth in the heat stages of the 4 x 400m.

There have been claims that Singh won 77 of his 80 races, but these are spurious. The number of races in which he participated is not verified, nor is the number of victories, but he lost a 400m race at the 1964 National Games in Calcutta to Makhan Singh and he did not finish first in any of his four races at the 1960 Olympic Games or the aforementioned qualification races at the 1956 Olympics.

Singh's time in the 1960 Olympics 400m final, which was run on a cinder track, set a national record that stood until 1998 when Paramjit Singh exceeded it on a synthetic track and with fully automatic timing that recorded 45.70 seconds. Although Singh's Olympic result of 45.6 seconds had been hand-timed, an electronic system at those Games had determined his record to be 45.73.

Later life

Singh was promoted from the rank of sepoy to junior commissioned officer in recognition of his successes in the 1958 Asian Games. He subsequently became Director of Sports in Punjab Ministry of Education, a post he retired from in 1998.

Singh was awarded the Padma Shri, India's fourth-highest civilian award, following his success in 1958. In 2001, he turned down an offer of the Arjuna Award from the Indian government, arguing that it was intended to recognise young sports people and not those such as him. He also thought that the Award was being inappropriately given to people who had little notable involvement as active sports people at all. He said that "I have been clubbed with sportspersons who are nowhere near the level that I had achieved" and that the award had become devalued.

 While sharing his experience in a college in Goa in 2014, he stated, "The awards nowadays are distributed like 'prasad' in a temple. Why should one be honoured when he or she has not achieved the benchmark for the award? I rejected the Arjuna I was offered after I received the Padma Shri. It was like being offered an SSC [secondary school] certificate after securing a Masters degree."

All of Singh's medals have been donated to the nation. They were displayed at the Jawaharlal Nehru Stadium in New Delhi and later moved to a sports museum in Patiala, where a pair of running shoes that he wore in Rome are also displayed. In 2012, he donated the Adidas shoes that he had worn in the 1960 400m final to be sold in a charity auction organised by actor Rahul Bose.

Singh was admitted to the intensive care unit at Fortis Hospital in Mohali on 24 May 2021 with pneumonia caused by COVID-19. His condition was, for a while, described as stable, but he died on 18 June 2021 at 11:30pm in Chandigarh. His wife, Nirmal Saini, had died a few days earlier on 13 June 2021, also due to COVID-19. Singh was laid on his funeral pyre with a photo of his wife in his hands.

Media and popular culture

Singh and his daughter, Sonia Sanwalka, co-wrote his autobiography, titled The Race of My Life. It was published in 2013. The book inspired Bhaag Milkha Bhaag, a 2013 biographical film of Singh's life. The film is directed by Rakeysh Omprakash Mehra, and stars Farhan Akhtar in the title role, with Sonam Kapoor, Meesha Shafi and Divya Dutta in female lead roles. The film was widely acclaimed in India and won awards including the National Film Award for Best Popular Film Providing Wholesome Entertainment at the National Film Awards, and 5 awards at the International Indian Film Academy Awards in 2014. The film made over  crores. Singh sold the movie rights for one rupee but inserted a clause stating that a share of the profits would be given to the Milkha Singh Charitable Trust. The Trust was founded in 2003 with the aim of assisting poor and needy sportspeople.

In September 2017, Singh's wax statue – created by sculptors of Madame Tussauds in London – was unveiled at Chandigarh. It depicts Singh in running posture during his victorious run at the 1958 Commonwealth Games. The statue is placed at Madame Tussauds museum in New Delhi, India. After winning India's first track and field gold medal at the 2020 Olympics, Neeraj Chopra dedicated his victory to Singh.

Personal life
, Singh lived in Chandigarh. He met Nirmal Saini, a former captain of the Indian women's volleyball team in Ceylon in 1955; they married in 1962 and had three daughters and a son, the golfer Jeev Milkha Singh. In 1999, they adopted the seven-year-old son of Havildar Bikram Singh, who had died in the Battle of Tiger Hill.

Records and honours

Awards

Honours

Bibliography 

 
Biopic - Bhaag Milkha Bhaag

Notes

References

External links 

 
 
 
 
 
 Milkha Singh at Punjabipedia
Sports and Achievements, Indian Army.
 
 

1929 births
2021 deaths
Indian male sprinters
Olympic athletes of India
Athletes (track and field) at the 1960 Summer Olympics
Indian Sikhs
Recipients of the Padma Shri in sports
Asian Games gold medalists for India
Punjabi people
Commonwealth Games medallists in athletics
Commonwealth Games gold medallists for India
Asian Games medalists in athletics (track and field)
Athletes (track and field) at the 1958 Asian Games
Athletes (track and field) at the 1962 Asian Games
People from Muzaffargarh District
People from Muzaffargarh
Athletes (track and field) at the 1964 Summer Olympics
Athletes (track and field) at the 1958 British Empire and Commonwealth Games
Athletes (track and field) at the 1956 Summer Olympics
Medalists at the 1958 Asian Games
Medalists at the 1962 Asian Games
Deaths from the COVID-19 pandemic in India
Medallists at the 1958 British Empire and Commonwealth Games